Ferdinand Friedensburg (17 November 1886 in Schweidnitz (present-day Świdnica) – 11 March 1972) was the interim Mayor of Berlin due to the illness of mayor Louise Schroeder during the Berlin Blockade in 1948.

Biography
The son of a judge graduated in 1914 at the Berlin College of Mines (Bergakademie). Homebound from the United States at the outbreak of World War I he was arrested by British Forces Gibraltar. On an attempt at flight Friedensburg was severely injured, resulting in a long-term stay in hospital. Not able-bodied for military service he served at the German embassy in Bern until the end of the war.

Back to Berlin he joined the German Democratic Party (DDP) in 1920 and in 1921 became district administrator (Landrat) at Rosenberg, Marienwerder (today Susz, Poland). In 1925 Friedensburg was appointed vice president of the Berlin state police agency and in 1927 became region president of the Prussian Regierungsbezirk Kassel. As a supporter of the Weimar Coalition's Reichsbanner Schwarz-Rot-Gold paramilitary group his times in office were marked by fierce conflicts with the rising forces of the Communists and the Nazi Party. By September 1933 he was dismissed from state service.

In June 1945 Friedensburg was among the founders of the Christian Democratic Union in Berlin. After the elections of October 1946 he became a deputy mayor of the city council under Otto Ostrowski and remained in that office when Louise Schroeder succeeded Ostrowski on 8 May 1947.

Friedensburg continued to hold great power in the Soviet occupation zone as chairman of the eastern sector of the CDU and the German Central Fuel Industry Administration. Although he had good relations with the Soviet Military Administration in Germany, he was despised by Walter Ulbricht and the ruling Socialist Unity Party of Germany (SED). When Ulbricht and Gustav Sobottka began plotting to oust him and accused him to the NKVD of maintaining contacts with former Nazis, he fled to West Berlin.

After the Soviet blockade of the western sectors had begun on 24 June 1948, Schroeder fell seriously ill and had to proceed to Hamburg for medical treatment. Friedensburg as her deputy from 14 August acted as mayor until on 30 November the Socialist Unity Party of Germany (SED) backed by the Soviet authorities proclaimed a separate city council of East Berlin under Friedrich Ebert Jr. and hindered Friedensburg from entering his office in Mitte. Though Schroeder officially reassumed office the next day, the elections called for 5 December could only be held in West Berlin and resulted in Ernst Reuter becoming mayor of West Berlin.

Friedensburg continued his political career as a member of the Bundestag (1952–1965) and of the European Parliament (1958–1965).

References

External links 
 
 

1886 births
1972 deaths
People from Świdnica
People from the Province of Silesia
German Democratic Party politicians
Christian Democratic Union of Germany politicians
Mayors of Berlin
Grand Crosses with Star and Sash of the Order of Merit of the Federal Republic of Germany
Members of the Bundestag for Berlin
Members of the Bundestag 1961–1965
Members of the Bundestag 1957–1961
Members of the Bundestag 1953–1957
Members of the Bundestag 1949–1953